Orion Classics started in 1982 as the distribution label for the then independent film production company Orion Pictures, now owned by Metro-Goldwyn-Mayer. It was relaunched in 2018.

The original focus of 1980-era Orion Classics was on acquiring independent and foreign films for North American distribution, as headed by Michael Barker, Tom Bernard, and Marcie Bloom. In addition it aimed to produce some arthouse films of its own. It was launched when Barker, Bernard and Donna Gigliotti moved from UA Classics, a United Artists specialty division. Among its most notable films were Babette's Feast, Pedro Almodóvar's Women on the Verge of a Nervous Breakdown, Jim Jarmusch's Mystery Train and Richard Linklater's Slacker.

Since its relaunch Orion Classics has released Mike P. Nelson's The Domestics and Jim Cummings' The Wolf of Snow Hollow, among others.

History
Orion Classics was formed by Orion Pictures in 1982 as an autonomous division for specialty films. United Artists Classics executives, Tom Bernard, Michael Barker and Donna Gigliotti, having a dispute with its parent United Artists left to fill Orion Classics' executive ranks, thus mirroring Orion Pictures' formation. With the UA Classics executives, the division had built in connection with the art house film community. While the three executives had different titles and responsibilities they acted as all having the same responsibilities.

The division took on the early UA Classics modus operandi of frugal marketing spending and strict staggered releasing with few prints. Thus 10 to 50 prints would be made based on its potential success with an average marketing budget of $225,000 would be first released in New York City before moving on to other metropolitan areas and given time to find its position.

The team was able to get French filmmaker Eric Rohmer to switch from UA Classics to Orion. He was then the source of its first film and box office hit with Pauline at the Beach in July 1983. Thus Orion Classics released four out of five of Rohmer's 1980s films and investing in a few of them. Orion's last acquisition in 1983 was its first independent US movie, Strangers Kiss (1984).

In August 1983, the company had indicated that they would be into production of its own material by late 1984 or early 1985. However, Orion Pictures was having more box office failures then successes thus those plans were put on hold.

In late 1991, when Orion Pictures was in serious financial trouble, Barker, Bernard, and Bloom left Orion Classics, taking the rights to the highly anticipated Merchant Ivory Productions adaptation of Howards End with them; at the invitation of former Orion president Mike Medavoy, who was now relocated at TriStar Pictures, the three set up Sony Pictures Classics, with Howards End as the company's first release.

In the mid-1990s, Metromedia acquired Orion, and merged the classics division into the Samuel Goldwyn Company. Both Orion and SGC were sold to Metro-Goldwyn-Mayer in 1997, with the latter's function of producing and/or distributing independent films being assumed by MGM's United Artists division.

Relaunch 
In May 2018, it was announced that Orion Classics would be revived as a multiplatform distribution label, with 8 to 10 films being released per year. Orion Classics will be MGM's method of getting into the day-and-date theatrical-VOD business. The label's first film is Mike P. Nelson's The Domestics, which was released in theaters on June 28, 2018, and on VOD and digital the next day.

Film library

References

External links

.01
Entertainment companies based in California
Companies based in Los Angeles
Companies that filed for Chapter 11 bankruptcy in 1991
American companies established in 1982
Entertainment companies established in 1982
1982 establishments in California
American independent film studios
Metro-Goldwyn-Mayer subsidiaries